Baliste was a   built for the French Navy in the first decade of the 20th century. Completed in 1904, the ship was initially assigned to the Northern Squadron.

Design and description
The Arquebuse class was designed as a faster version of the preceding . The two vertical triple-expansion steam engines each drove one propeller shaft using steam provided by two du Temple Guyot or Normand boilers. Their crew consisted of four officers and fifty-eight enlisted men.

The main armament of the Arquebuse-class ships consisted of a single  gun forward of the bridge and six  Hotchkiss guns in single mounts, three on each broadside. They were fitted with two single rotating mounts for  torpedo tubes on the centerline, one between the funnels and the other on the stern.

Construction and career
Baliste was laid down in 1901 at the Ateliers et Chantiers de Saint-Nazaire Penhoët shipyard in Rouen and launched on 22 October 1903. She reached a speed of  during her sea trials between December 1903 and June 1904.

Service
In October 1914, Baliste was employed on patrols off the western end of the English Channel. Later in the war she was based at Bizerte and then Salonika. She was stricken and sold for scrap on 30 October 1919.

References

Bibliography

 

Arquebuse-class destroyers
Ships built in France
1903 ships